Chandra Crawford (born November 19, 1983) is a Canadian cross-country skier who has competed since 2001 at the age of 16.  Prior to this, she was a biathlete for five years. She was born in Canmore, Alberta, Canada.

Career
On February 22, 2006, she became the surprise gold medal winner in the women's cross-country  sprint at the 2006 Winter Olympics in Turin, Italy. Video of her circulated on the Internet as she sang "O Canada", the Canadian national anthem, from the medals podium. Then-CBC commentator Brian Willams said of the event: "If you're ever standing on top of the podium, this is how you sing our national anthem."

She won her first World Cup gold medal in her home-town of Canmore in January 2008 in the sprint event, followed by a second gold in Lahti, Finland, in March 2008. She finished the 2008 World Cup season ranked seventh in the sprint and 23rd overall.

Crawford placed 44th in the freestyle sprint during the 2014 Winter Olympics in Sochi, Russia. On March 27, 2014, she retired from competitive skiing.

Cross-country skiing results
All results are sourced from the International Ski Federation (FIS).

Olympic Games
 1 medal – (1 gold)

World Championships

World Cup

Season standings

Individual podiums
 2 victories – (2 ) 
 5 podiums – (4 , 1 )

Team podiums
 2 podiums – (2 )

Career highlights
Women's cross-country 1.1 kilometre sprint
 Silver – 2011 World Cup, Rogla, Slovenia
 Gold – 2008 World Cup, Lahti, Finland
 Gold – 2008 World Cup, Canmore, Alberta
 Silver – 2007 NorAm Cup, Mont-Sainte-Anne, Quebec
 Bronze – 2006 Tour de Ski, Munich, Germany
 Gold – 2006 Winter Olympics, Turin, Italy
 Bronze – 2006 World Cup, Davos, Switzerland
 Gold – 2005 Canadian Championships, Prince George, British Columbia
 Silver – 2004 Under-23 World Championships, Soldier Hollow, Utah, U.S.
Women's cross-country team relay
 Bronze – 2004 Under-23 World Championships, Soldier Hollow, Utah,

Honors
In 2018, Crawford was inducted into the Canada's Sports Hall of Fame.

References

External links
 
 
 

1983 births
Living people
Canadian female cross-country skiers
Canadian female biathletes
Cross-country skiers at the 2006 Winter Olympics
Cross-country skiers at the 2010 Winter Olympics
Cross-country skiers at the 2014 Winter Olympics
Olympic gold medalists for Canada
Olympic cross-country skiers of Canada
People from Canmore, Alberta
Sportspeople from Alberta
Olympic medalists in cross-country skiing
Medalists at the 2006 Winter Olympics
21st-century Canadian women